Nancy is a 2018 American mystery drama film written and directed by Christina Choe in her debut feature film. It stars Andrea Riseborough, J. Smith-Cameron, Ann Dowd, John Leguizamo, and Steve Buscemi. It had its world premiere at the Sundance Film Festival on January 20, 2018. It was released on June 8, 2018, by Samuel Goldwyn Films.

Plot

Nancy Freeman is a lonely woman who lives with her ailing mother Beth. An aspiring short story writer whose submissions are routinely rejected, Nancy finds an outlet for her creativity and need for attention and affection by running a blog in which she claims to be the grieving mother of a dead child. Off the blog, she meets Jeb, a divorced father grieving the loss of his daughter. Posing as being pregnant, having purchased a prosthetic belly, they get coffee together and connect. However, upon a chance encounter at a grocery store, Jeb discovers that Nancy isn't pregnant after all and becomes upset and never sees her again. 

Soon thereafter, Beth passes away from a stroke. Nancy sees a news report about a couple - Leo and Ellen - who have never given up the search for their daughter, who was kidnapped as a child thirty years prior. Noting a vague resemblance between herself and an age progression of the couple's daughter, Nancy contacts them, claiming she may have been kidnapped and that she is their child. 

Ellen, a professor of comparative literature, is quick to believe that Nancy is her daughter after seeing a photo of her while Leo, a psychologist, remains more skeptical. When Nancy visits, he quickly sets up a DNA test for the next day. Nancy's cat is parked in the sun room as Leo is allergic.

After dinner, Ellen sleeps alongside Nancy, in her daughter's bedroom - which hasn't been changed or slept in since her disappearance. She sleeps deeply. Next day, Leo shows Nancy his photo gallery in the attic and takes her photo. A man arrives to take a saliva sample and ask Nancy a few questions. He says the DNA test will take three days. The three then go to an art gallery together and share meals and get to know each other. Nancy confides in Ellen her dream of being a writer and shares her work with the couple. Ellen enjoys it and offers to send it to an editor she knows, much to Nancy's delight.    

Ellen receives the results of the DNA test results and it is confirmed that Nancy isn't her daughter. On a walk with Nancy, she reveals she blames herself for her daughter's disappearance as Brooke ran off to see a kitten in a pet shop. Nancy comforts her. A gunshot is heard and a young man runs out desperate for a phone. Ellen dials 911 and Nancy applies compression to a boy's bleeding while they wait for the ambulance.

Later that night, Ellen hugs Nancy and whispers 'I love you', suggesting she is happy to have her in the couple's life despite the DNA results. But Nancy panics and leaves in the night while the couple sleep.

Cast
 Andrea Riseborough as Nancy Freeman
 Steve Buscemi as Leo Lynch
 Ann Dowd as Betty Freeman, Nancy's Mother
 John Leguizamo as Jeb
 J. Smith-Cameron as Ellen Lynch, Leo's Wife
 Virginia Kull as Deb Loden
 Owen Campbell as Jordan

Release
The film premiered at the 2018 Sundance Film Festival on January 20, 2018. Shortly after, Samuel Goldwyn Films acquired distribution rights to the film. It was released on June 8, 2018.

Reception

Box office
Nancy grossed $80,115 in the United States and Canada and $11,885 in other territories for a worldwide total of $92,000.

Critical response
The website's critics consensus reads, "Nancy is an uncomfortable watch, but worth the effort thanks to Andrea Riseborough's central performance -- and writer-director Christina Choe's powerful empathy for her character's dangerously misguided choices." Metacritic reports a weighted average score of 67 out of 100, based on 17 reviews, indicating "generally favorable reviews".

References

External links
 
 

2018 films
2018 drama films
2018 directorial debut films
2018 independent films
2010s mystery drama films
American mystery drama films
Films about missing people
Films about writers
2010s English-language films
2010s American films